The Norwegian University of Life Sciences (NMBU) is a public university located in Ås, Norway. It is located at Ås in Viken, near Oslo, and at Adamstuen in Oslo and has around 5,200 students.

History

The institution was established in 1859 as the Higher Agricultural College (Den høiere Landbrugsskole). In 1897 the institution was transformed into the Norwegian College of Agriculture (Norges Landbrugshøiskole, later spelled Norges Landbrukshøiskole, Norges landbrukshøyskole and Norges landbrukshøgskole, abbreviated NLH). It received the status of a university-level college (vitenskapelig høgskole). In 2005 it received university status and was renamed the Norwegian University of Life Sciences (Universitetet for miljø- og biovitenskap; UMB). In 2014 the it merged with the Norwegian School of Veterinary Science (NVH) in Oslo; it retained its English name but was formally renamed Norges miljø- og biovitenskapelige universitet (NMBU) in Norwegian. It is the only educational institution in Norway to provide veterinary education.

Organization

The university is organized into seven faculties:

Biosciences
Chemistry, Biotechnology and Food Science
Environmental Sciences and Natural Resource Management
Landscape and Society
School of Economics and Business
Science and Technology
Veterinary Medicine

It also includes eight centers:
 Aquaculture Protein Center (APC)
 Animal Production Experimental Centre (SHF)
 Centre for Plant Research in Controlled Climate (SKP)
 Centre for Continuing Education (SEVU)
 The Centre for Integrative Genetics  (Cigene)
Centre for Landscape Democracy (CLaD)
 Norwegian Centre for Bioenergy Research
 Imaging Centre Campus Ås

Degree programmes
Bachelor's degree programmes in English
 International Environment and Development Studies

Master's degree programmes in English
 Agroecology
 Animal Breeding and Genetics
 Aquatic Food production - Safety and Quality
 Aquaculture
 Data Science
 Development and Natural Resource Economics
 Ecology
 Feed Manufacturing Technology
 International Development Studies
 International Environmental Studies
 International Relations
 Radioecology

Bachelor's degree programmes in Norwegian
 Animal Science
 Biotechnology

 Business Administration
 Chemistry
 Ecology
 Economics
 Environment and Natural Resources
 Food Science
 Forest, Environment and Industry
 Geomatics
 Landscape Construction and Management
 Natural Science
 Plant Science
 Renewable Energy

Master's degree programmes in Norwegian - 5 years
 Chemistry and Biotechnology
 Environmental Physics and Renewable Energy
 Geomatics
 Industrial Economics
 Landscape Architecture
 Mechanical engineering
 Property and Land Law
 Robotics
 Spatial Planning
 Structural Engineering and Architecture
 Urban and Regional Planning
 Teacher Education in Natural Sciences
 Water and Environmental Technology

Master's degree programmes in Norwegian - 2 years
 Animal Science
 Bioinformatics and Applied Statistics
 Biology
 Biotechnology
 Business Administration
 Chemistry
 Environment and Natural Resources
 Food Science
 Forest Sciences
 Innovation and Entrepreneurship
 Management of Natural Resources
 Mathematical, Physical and Computational Sciences
 Microbiology
 Nature-based Development and Innovation
 Packaging
 Plant Science
 Public Health
 Real Estate Development
 Renewable Energy

PhD studies
Doctoral programmes are based on a continuation in the Norwegian degree system from a master's degree or an equivalent qualification. A doctoral programme consists of course work, (an) individual research project(s) and a dissertation, which is defended in a formal oral examination.

Other programmes in Norwegian
 One-year Teacher Education programme - part-time
 One-year Teacher Education programme - full-time
 Science

Students do not have to pay tuition. The Norwegian government subsidizes all higher education.

International students

NMBU has exchange agreements with more than 93 universities worldwide, including six Nordic, 44 European and eight North American institutions. Institutional partnerships with universities in developing countries are carried out mainly through the Department of International Environmental and Development Studies/Noragric. The objectives of NMBU’s cooperation with universities abroad include building strong academic networks, facilitating international exchange and contributing to the competence building with universities in the south.

Research
Research at NMBU includes basic research and applied research, providing a foundation for education, research training and research geared towards the private sector. Research is mainly focused on Environmental Sciences, Veterinary medicine, Food Science, Biotechnology, Aquaculture and Business Development. It also has a strong interdisciplinary and international approach. There is a strong link between research and the NMBU study programs; students at the Master and PhD level are often involved in many research activities.
Research is also a joint venture between research institutes in Ås. Together, the university and the institutions represent the largest research environments for life sciences in Norway. NMBU is also active through national alliances with other institutions and through institutional partnerships with universities in developing countries. NMBU’s health-related research is linked to healthy food, clean water and the environment and the many related challenges in developing countries.

Student life

Student Housing
The Pentagon, a group of buildings south of the NMBU campus, houses students. Other students live in private housing.

Organizations
University Foundation for Student Life in Ås (SiÅs)
The University Foundation for Student Life in Ås was established in 1955 under and in pursuance of the Act of 28.06.96 of Student unions. SiÅs shall:
 provide the students with good and reasonable welfare offers
 promote the students’ interests
 contribute do that NMBU becomes and attractive place to study and work
SiÅs is in charge of the student accommodations, sports center, bookstore, print shop, restaurant and cafeterias, nursery, kiosk and booking of meeting and function rooms.

Studentsamfunnet in Ås
The NMBU student community consists of 60-70 clubs and societies that both alone and together offer most students unique and social activities with many challenges. Studentsamfunnet in Ås is the oldest and most powerful society that owns most of the buildings that bring most of the social activities together.

The Student Board
The Student Board (NSO Ås) deals with everything that concerns student democracy, including daily contact with SiÅs and contact with the different student representatives in various boards, assemblies and committees. The Student Board is the administrative head of the Student Parliament, but it is the Student Parliament that controls the Student Board. The Student Committee consists of elected representatives from each department plus elected members of the Student Board. The highest body in the student democracy is the general assembly (Allmøtet). Here, all students have speaking and voting rights. Representatives to the Student Board are elected at the general assembly, which is held every autumn and spring. at the department general assemblies, student representatives on department level are elected. All students have speaking and voting rights on their department’s general assemblies.

International Student Union
The International Student Union (ISU) is an organization composed of international students that attend various universities and Høgskolen throughout Norway and who have particular interest in student politics and international student rights. ISU is a democratic, non-profit, non-religious, multicultural and non-partisan organization that seeks to serve and promote the interests of foreign students who are studying in Norway. ISU represents the voice of international students in political and academic matters and has to main aims:
 to ensure that the rights and interests of all international students are suitably represented and protected
 to maintain social welfare
ISU also promotes the relationship between Norwegian and international students and works to sustain the connections with local student organizations. Membership with ISU is free and open to all international students in Norway. Elections are held once a year in September and all international students have the right o run for office and vote.
The members of the board meet in the student post office approximately every two weeks after classes and work as a team to discuss many different aspects of the international student life. ISU is a democracy and each member has the right to propose, suggest and advise.
The highest branch of the ISU is the National Assembly that carries out the working plans and approves budgets for all of the ISU branches. Local branches have the autonomy to decide the conditions for their own activities.

Newspapers
Tuntreet

Athletics
GG-Hallen, the university’s sports hall, offers recreational sports clubs.

Alumni
 

Eivind Dale (1979)

See also
Biology
Glossary of biology

References

External links
 NMBU official web site in English
 Samfunnet i Ås

 
Life Sciences
Science and technology in Norway
Education in Viken (county)
Business schools in Norway
Ås, Akershus
Educational institutions established in 1859
1859 establishments in Norway
Universities and colleges formed by merger in Norway